Pius Suter (born 24 May 1996) is a Swiss professional ice hockey forward for the Detroit Red Wings of the National Hockey League (NHL). He has also played in the NHL for the Chicago Blackhawks.

Playing career
Suter played as a youth in the junior program of the ZSC Lions before opting to play major junior hockey in North America with the Guelph Storm of the Ontario Hockey League (OHL) after his selection in the CHL Import Draft in 2013. Suter helped contribute with 24 points in 66 games as Guelph were crowned OHL champions. At the completion of his second season with the Storm in 2014–15, Suter recorded a break-out season in posting over a point-per-game average with 72  in just 61 games with Guelph.

At the end of his junior career, Suter opted to pursue his professional career with the ZSC Lions. In the 2016–17 season, Suter was signed to a one-year contract extension through 2018 on 20 December 2016.

On 26 August 2017, Suter scored a CHL record of 4 goals with the Lions in an 11–1 blowout win against French team, Rapaces de Gap.

Suter was invited to the 2017 Ottawa Senators rookie camp in September, forcing him to miss the start of the 2017–18 season. On his return, Suter would go on to be a part of the ZSC Lions NL championship winning team, leading the team in assists for the season.

Prior to the start of the 2018–19 season, the ZSC Lions announced that Suter had been included in the training camp roster for the New York Islanders. Returning to ZSC after failing to gain a contract with the Islanders, on 28 November 2018, Suter agreed to an early four-year contract extension with the Lions through the 2022–23 season.

Suter finished the 2019–20 season as the league's PostFinance Top Scorer with 53 points, including 30 goals, in 50 regular season games. He was also named MVP of the regular season. On 13 July 2020, Suter announced he was leaving the NL and the ZSC Lions, using his exit-clause in his contract in order to pursue his career in North America and the NHL.

On 16 July 2020, Suter was signed as an undrafted free agent to a one-year, entry-level contract with the Chicago Blackhawks. With the 2020–21 North American season set to be delayed due to the ongoing COVID-19 pandemic, Suter remained in Switzerland and was loaned by the Blackhawks to return to ZSC Lions' affiliate, the GCK Lions of the Swiss League, on 9 September 2020. On 2 November, with the NHL future still uncertain, Suter officially returned to the ZSC Lions.

On 20 December 2020, after making six appearances with the Lions, Suter was recalled from loan by the Blackhawks. Suter made his NHL debut with the Blackhawks on 13 January 2021 against the Tampa Bay Lightning. Suter scored his first NHL goal, as well as his first career hat trick, on 24 January against Jonathan Bernier of the Detroit Red Wings. He became the second player in franchise history to score each of his first three career NHL goals in the same game, joining Bill Kendall on 17 December, 1933.

On 28 July 2021, the Detroit Red Wings signed Suter to a two-year contract. Appearing in all 82 regular season games during the 2021–22 NHL season, Suter recorded 15 goals and 21 assists in his first year with the Red Wings.

International play
Suter first represented Switzerland at the junior level at the 2013 IIHF World U18 Championships. He also featured for the Swiss at the 2013 Ivan Hlinka Memorial Tournament and in two World Junior Championships in 2015, and 2016.

Suter was added to the Swiss national team at the senior level in preparation for the 2017 IIHF World Championship. He would make the final squad and make his full international debut in the round-robin stage.

Suter was named as part of Switzerland's roster for the 2018 Winter Olympics, where he scored a hat-trick in the game against South Korea, also adding assists on Switzerland's lone goals in the game against the Czech Republic and the playoff game against Germany.

Career statistics

Regular season and playoffs

International

References

External links
 

1996 births
Living people
Chicago Blackhawks players
Detroit Red Wings players
GCK Lions players
Guelph Storm players
Ice hockey players at the 2018 Winter Olympics
Olympic ice hockey players of Switzerland
Swiss ice hockey forwards
Undrafted National Hockey League players
ZSC Lions players